David Jacob Simonsen (17 March 1853 – 15 June 1932) was born in Copenhagen, Denmark. He studied Oriental languages at the University of Copenhagen, and received his rabbinical training at the Jewish Theological Seminary in Breslau, one of the centers for "Wissenschaft des Judentums", a movement advocating the scientific study of Jewish history, literature, and culture in addition to the classical sources of Judaism.

After his graduation, Simonsen returned to Denmark, where he married Cora Caroline Salomon (1856–1938). He served from 1821 to 1902 and again briefly from 1919 to 1920. In 1903, Simonsen was awarded the title of professor by the University of Copenhagen.

Simonsen's archives reflect the history of several scientific disciplines over a full half century. The list of correspondents contains the names of leading scientists within Oriental and Jewish Studies but also from other areas, such as the classicist Ada Adler. During World War I, Simonsen acted as "communication central", maintaining all the important contacts in Denmark and abroad, between organisations and individuals. He was also able to relay messages between relatives on different sides of the front, and after the war, he continued to be active in different relief organisations, both in Denmark and abroad. The approximately 25,000 volumes in Hebrew, Yiddish, and several Western European languages, along with 190 volumes of manuscripts in some 15 languages from 20 countries were acquired by The Royal Library in 1932. Simonsen's collection forms the core of the library's Judaica Collection.

References

External links

 The Royal Library's website about David Simonsen
 David Simonsen at Gravsted.dk

1932 deaths
1853 births
20th-century Danish people
20th-century rabbis
Danish Jews
Danish rabbis